James John Cronin (August 7, 1905 – June 10, 1983) was an American Major League Baseball infielder. He played for the Philadelphia Athletics during the  season.

References

 

Major League Baseball infielders
Philadelphia Athletics players
Baseball players from California
1905 births
1983 deaths
Idaho Falls Spuds players
American expatriate baseball players in Panama
Des Moines Demons players
Kansas City Blues players
Little Rock Travelers players
Mission Bells players
Portland Beavers players
Sacramento Senators players